Charlesworth is a surname that derives from Charlesworth in Derbyshire, England. Notable people with the surname include:

Alan Charlesworth (1903–1978), Australian military officer
Albany Charlesworth (1854–1914), British politician
Albert Charlesworth (1865–1926), English cricketer
Alfred Charlesworth (1865–1928), English cricketer
Arnold Charlesworth (1930–1972), English footballer
Arthur Charlesworth (1898–1966), English footballer
Barry Charlesworth, rugby league player
Ben Charlesworth (born 2000), English cricketer
Brent Charlesworth (born 1942), British politician
Brian Charlesworth (born 1945), British evolutionary biologist
Bruce Charlesworth (born 1950), American visual artist
Chris Charlesworth, British music journalist
Clifford E. Charlesworth (1931–1991), NASA Flight Director
Crowther Charlesworth (1875–1953), English cricketer
David Charlesworth (born 1951), English Catholic abbot
Deborah Charlesworth (born 1943), British evolutionary biologist
Dick Charlesworth (1932–2008), jazz musician
Dorothy Charlesworth (1927–1981), British archaeologist
Edward Charlesworth (1813–1893), English geologist and palaeontologist
Edward Parker Charlesworth (1783–1853), English physician
Florence L. Barclay née Charlesworth (1862–1921), English novelist
Graham Charlesworth (born 1965), English cricketer
Hector Charlesworth (1872–1945), Canadian writer, editor, and critic
Hilary Charlesworth (born 1955), Australian feminist and international law scholar
Jack Charlesworth (footballer) (1895–1960), Australian rules footballer
James H. Charlesworth (born 1940), American academic
John Charlesworth (1902–1962), American football player
John Charlesworth (1815–1880) British colliery owner and politician
John Kaye Charlesworth (1889–1972), British geologist
Jonathon Charlesworth, Australian field hockey player
Kate Charlesworth (born 1950), British cartoonist
Lester Charlesworth (1916–1980), Australian cricketer
Luke Charlesworth (born 1992), New Zealand badminton player
Maria Louisa Charlesworth (1819–1880), English children's writer
Martin Charlesworth (1895–1950), English classical scholar
Maud Ballington Booth née Charlesworth (1865–1948),  Salvation Army leader and co-founder of the Volunteers of America
Max Charlesworth (1925–2014), Australian philosopher and intellectual
Michelle Charlesworth (born 1970), American television news reporter
Natalie Charlesworth, Australian judge
Ric Charlesworth (born 1952), Australian cricketer and field hockey player and coach
Richard Charlesworth (swimmer) (born 1988), English swimmer
Sarah Charlesworth (1947–2013), American conceptual artist and photographer
Sarah Charlesworth (actress), Canadian actress
Sian Charlesworth (born 1987), English singer
Stan Charlesworth, English footballer
Todd Charlesworth (born 1965), Canadian ice hockey player
Violet Charlesworth (1884–?), British fraudster

References 

English toponymic surnames